Hermitage of Santa Ana may also refer to:

Spain:

Hermitage of Santa Ana, in Xàtiva (Valencia).